The Webb River is a  river in western Maine. It is a tributary of the Androscoggin River, which flows to the Kennebec River and ultimately the Atlantic Ocean.

The Webb River begins at the outlet of Webb Lake near the southern border of the town of Weld and flows south, quickly entering the town of Carthage, where it turns southwest, then south again. The southernmost  of the river forms the boundary between the towns of Mexico and Dixfield. The river enters the Androscoggin just west of the village of Dixfield.  The entire course of the river is paralleled by Maine Route 142.

See also
 List of rivers of Maine

References

Maine Streamflow Data from the USGS
Maine Watershed Data From Environmental Protection Agency

Tributaries of the Kennebec River
Rivers of Maine
Rivers of Franklin County, Maine
Rivers of Oxford County, Maine